Brizon may refer to:
 "Brizon" (Lexx), an episode of Lexx
 Brizon, Haute-Savoie, France
 Roni Brizon, Israeli politician

See also 
 Brison (disambiguation)